Trade Winds is a 1938 American comedy murder mystery film directed by Tay Garnett written by Dorothy Parker, Alan Campbell, and Frank R. Adams, based on story by Tay Garnett. The film stars Fredric March and Joan Bennett, with a supporting cast featuring Thomas Mitchell, Ralph Bellamy and Ann Sothern. Distributed by United Artists, Trade Winds was released on December 28, 1938.

Plot
Socialite Kay Kerrigan (Joan Bennett) is accused of fatally shooting millionaire cad Thomas Bruhme II (Sidney Blackmer). Kay blames the callous Bruhme for her sister's suicide but when he is confronted, he dismissively throws Kay a gun, but she angrily shoots him in the stomach.

Police detectives Ben "Homer" Blodgett (Ralph Bellamy) and George Faulkner (Robert Elliott) find the body, with a gunshot in the back of Bruhme's head that is the fatal shot. After finding her handbag at the murder scene, the police are on Kay's trail. First she fakes a car accident, driving into the San Francisco Bay, then makes arrangements to go to Hawaii. When she pawns a unique piece of jewelry, Police Commissioner Blackton (Thomas Mitchell) knows that Kay is alive and puts former detective Sam Wye (Fredric March) on the case.

Kay with her hair dyed brown, and travelling on a British passport as "Mary Holden" has taken a ship to the South Seas. She is followed by Sam and his secretary Jean Livingstone (Ann Sothern), an old flame who also wants to collect a $100,000 reward now being offered by Bruhme's father.

On a boat sailing to Saigon, Sam finally meets Kay, and immediately falls in love with her. Along the way, Homer and Jean do the same. Sam eventually determines that the actual killer was John Johnson (Richard Tucker), a jealous husband whose wife was having an affair with Bruhme. Kay is thus cleared and free to marry Sam.

Cast
 Fredric March as Sam Wye 
 Joan Bennett as Kay Kerrigan
 Ralph Bellamy as Ben Blodgett 
 Ann Sothern as Jean Livingstone 
 Sidney Blackmer as Thomas Bruhme II 
 Thomas Mitchell as Commissioner Blackton 
 Robert Elliott as Detective George Faulkner
 Joyce Compton as Mrs. Johnson
 Richard Tucker as John Johnson
 Dorothy Comingore as Ann (credited as Linda Winters)
 Wilma Francis as Judy

Production
Principal photography on Trade Winds took place from August 22 to October 20, 1938. The film was a "labor of love" for Tay Garnett. Frank Nugent described the process in his review for The New York Times:
Tay Garnett earned the distinction yesterday of being probably the first man in history with the temerity to invite 80,000,000 persons to pay to see the movies he took on a world cruise. Mr. Garnett went abroad a few seasons ago and, having a rough outline of a script, he shot doorways in Japan, barrooms in Indo-China, the race track at Singapore, a pier in Bombay, a fishing village in the Laccadives, a twisting street in pre-war Shanghai. Hollywood bridged the gaps, set up the process screen, placed Fredric March and Joan Bennett before it ...

Release
Frank Nugent in his contemporary review ofTrade Winds for The New York Times, said: ""Trade Winds," which blew gently into the Music Hall yesterday and may be remembered by posterity as the process shot that went 'round the world. It is not exactly a travelogue. As a mystery film it's a bit on the porous side. We hesitate to call it a romantic comedy, beginning as it does with a suicide, adding a murder and ending with a third body on the floor. And certainly it's not a straight drama. Maybe a new word is in order—a travestery comiromance, or a dramalogue of travesty."

References

Notes

Citations

Bibliography

 Bernstein, Matthew. Walter Wagner: Hollywood Independent. Minneapolis, Minnesota: University of Minnesota Press, 2000. .

External links
 
 
 
 
 Trade Winds at Allmovie
 Still Photos from 'Trade Winds' by Ned Scott
Streaming audio
 Trade Winds on Lux Radio Theater: March 4, 1940 
 Trade Winds on the Screen Directors Playhouse: May 29, 1949

1938 films
1930s comedy mystery films
American comedy thriller films
American black-and-white films
American detective films
1930s English-language films
Films scored by Alfred Newman
Films directed by Tay Garnett
Films set in San Francisco
Films with screenplays by Dorothy Parker
United Artists films
Films produced by Walter Wanger
1938 comedy films
1930s American films